Fisher Football Club is a football club based in Rotherhithe, Southwark, England. The club was established in 2009 after Fisher Athletic folded.

History
The club was established in 2009 by members of the Fisher Supporters Trust when Fisher Athletic was wound up in the High Court due to financial problems and closed down. The working name AFC Fisher was initially used, before the current name was settled on. The new club were accepted into the Kent League for the 2009–10 season, and were unanimously elected into the Premier Division at the league's AGM in June 2009. Former Fisher Athletic assistant manager Gary Lisney was appointed manager on 26 June.

Fisher finished bottom of the Kent League in 2010–11, but were not relegated. In 2013 the league was renamed the Southern Counties East League, and when the Kent Invicta League became its Division One in 2016, Fisher became members of the Premier Division. They finished second-from-bottom of the Premier Division in 2016–17 and were relegated to Division One. However, under manager Dean Harrison, a third-place finish in Division One the following season was good enough to earn promotion and an immediate return to the Premier Division for the 2018–19 season, where the side confounded expectation by finishing in third place having led the division for a large part of the winter. Harrison resigned in May 2019 and during the close season former Ilford FC manager Allan Fenn was appointed in his place.

Ground
The club initially groundshared at Dulwich Hamlet's Champion Hill, where Fisher Athletic had been playing since 2004, but began work on a new ground on Salter Road close to Fisher Athletic's old Surrey Docks Stadium. The ground opened in 2016, with the first match on 30 July, a 4–0 win against Farnborough OBG. In 2018, St Paul's Sports Ground hosted a number of games in the CONIFA World Cup.

Records
Best FA Cup performance: Second qualifying round, 2022–23
Best FA Vase performance: Second round, 2019–20

See also
Fisher F.C. players

References

External links
Official website

Football clubs in England
Football clubs in London
Fan-owned football clubs in England
Association football clubs established in 2009
2009 establishments in England
Phoenix clubs (association football)
Sport in the London Borough of Southwark
Southern Counties East Football League